The 1980 All-Ireland Senior Football Championship was the 94th staging of the All-Ireland Senior Football Championship, the Gaelic Athletic Association's premier inter-county Gaelic football tournament. The championship began on 11 May 1980 and ended on 21 September 1980.

Kerry entered the championship as the defending champions.

On 21 September 1980, Kerry won the championship following a 1-9 to 1-6 defeat of Roscommon in the All-Ireland final. This was their 26th All-Ireland title and their third in succession.

Offaly's Matt Connor was the championship's top scorer with 5-31. Kerry's Jack O'Shea was named as the Texaco Footballer of the Year.

Munster Championship format change

Following a number of one-sided results in the Munster Championship in the late 1970s, the Munster Council changed the format in 1980. Kerry, long regarded as the standard bearers in the province, were given a bye to the Munster final. Cork, who had been second to Kerry since 1975, were given a bye to a lone semi-final. The other four "weaker" teams (Clare, Limerick, Tipperary and Waterford) were paired against each other in two preliminary round games. The winners of these two games faced each other in a lone quarter-final with the winners of that game qualifying to meet Cork in the lone semi-final. This format was previously used in 1941 and lasted only one season.

Results

Connacht Senior Football Championship

Quarter-finals

Semi-finals

Final

Leinster Senior Football Championship

First round

   
 
 

Quarter-finals

   

   

Semi-finals

Final

Munster Senior Football Championship    

Preliminary round

 

Quarter-final

Semi-final

Final

Ulster Senior Football Championship

Preliminary round

Quarter-finals

  

Semi-finals

Final

All-Ireland Senior Football Championship

Semi-finals

 

Final

Championship statistics

Top scorers

Overall

Single game

Miscellaneous

 Limerick beat Clare for the first time since 1945 after a replay.
 At the Munster final between Cork and Kerry at Páirc Uí Chaoimh, Cork Secretary of the Cork County Board Frank Murphy delivered an oration in honour of Tom Barry, a guerrilla leader during the War of Independence. Barry had died in the week leading up to the game.
 Roscommon win the Connacht title for the fourth year in a row being the only time its happened not to be Galway/Mayo.
 Offaly stop Dublin to 7 Leinster titles in a row in the Leinster final.
 Roscommon play in the All Ireland final for the first time since 1962.
 The All Ireland semifinal between Kerry and Offaly sets a new record for goals (8) in a semifinal. It would not be equalled until 2020 and as of July 2022, it has not been surpassed.

References